Goniya Malimage Jayasekara Aponsu, (born 23 February 1951: Sinhala:ජයසේකර අපෝන්සු), popularly as Jayasekara Aponsu, is an actor in Sri Lankan cinema, theatre and television. Apart from that, he is also a director, and script writer.

Personal life
Jayasekara Aponsu was born on 23 February 1951 in Nuwara Eliya. Aponsu is married to Jayanthi Aponsu and they have one son, Thamira Aponsu. Aponsu first met his wife during a drama school conducted by him at Mount Lavinia in the 1970s. They married in 1978 after a love affair. Due to many circumstances and money problems, he abandoned and missed his wife and son for 30 years of time, until they united in 2016 March. Though he abandoned them, his sisters and brothers came closer to his wife and son in that crucial thirty years. However, he married Sujatha Priyadarshani in 2018, who is 42 years younger than Aponsu.

His sister Avanthi Aponsu is also a popular actress.

Career
He started his stage drama career with a 12 award-winning drama Pathale Soladaduwo. Some of his most popular stage dramas are Thatu, 31, Eri, Guru, Kira, Maha Saha Shen, Sako, Samanallu, Hathare Wattuwa, Giju, Proda, Iri, Tharuwa Vikine, Horu, and Madame Shoba staged more than 100 times throughout the country. Aponsu established a drama theatre school Shilpa Kala Guru Sewana for teaching young artists as well.

His most popular teledrama acting came through the comedy play Nonavaruni Mahathwaruni as Nihal Karapitiya. He got the character after a tragic accident killed actor Granville Rodrigo, who initially played the character. His first direction in teledrama came through Sil, which was a drama, horror, fantasy telecasted on Swarnavahini in 2007. In 2021, he directed the mini serial Uma.

Aponsu started his cinema career in 1973 with the film Suhada Pathuma. Since then, he acted more than 35 film across three decades. His first direction came through the film Ra Ru in 1999.

Selected television serials
 Class Sinhala Class
 Ingammaruwa
 Katu Pawura
 Madam Shobha 
 Mati Kadulu 
 Night Learners
 Nonavaruni Mahathwaruni
 Sabawen Awasarai
 Sangeethe
 Suraduthiyo
 Thoorya
 Uma

Filmography
 No. denotes the Number of Sri Lankan film in the Sri Lankan cinema.

As actor

As director
Re Ru - 1999
Seetha Man Awa - 2013
Tharu Soba - TBD

References

External links
 
 http://gossips.srilankaactress.info/2011/04/16/jayasekara-aponsu-joins-with-his-ex-wife-after-30-years/
 http://www.films.lk/ArtistDetails.php?id=160
 Seetha Man Awa
 රංගන දිවියේ හතළිස් වසරක් ජයසේකර අපොන්සු
 තරුව විකිණේ සමඟ අපොන්සු ආයෙත් වේදිකාවට

Living people
Sri Lankan male film actors
1951 births
Sinhalese male actors